A Bronx Tale is a 1993 American coming-of-age crime film directed by and starring Robert De Niro in his directorial debut and produced by Jane Rosenthal, adapted from Chazz Palminteri's 1989 play of the same name. It tells the coming of age story of an Italian-American boy, Calogero, who, after encountering a local Mafia boss, is torn between the temptations of organized crime and the values of his honest, hardworking father, as well as racial tensions in his community. The Broadway production was converted to film with limited changes, and starred Palminteri and De Niro.

De Niro, who first viewed the play in Los Angeles in 1990, acquired the rights from Palminteri, intent on making the play his directorial debut. The duo then worked heavily together on the screenplay, with Palminteri aiming to retain many of the aspects of the original script, as it was based largely on his own childhood. Production began in 1991, and was funded in collaboration with De Niro's TriBeCa Productions and Savoy Pictures, as the first film released by each studio.

A Bronx Tale premiered at the Toronto International Film Festival on September 14, 1993, and released in the United States on September 29, 1993. The film achieved limited commercial success, grossing over $17 million domestically. However, it fared much better with critics, who praised the performances of the leads, and launched Palminteri's acting career, while also helping De Niro gain acceptance as a director.

Plot

In 1960, Lorenzo works as an MTA bus driver in Belmont, a working-class Italian-American neighborhood in The Bronx, with his wife Rosina and their nine-year-old son Calogero. Calogero becomes enamored with the criminal life and Mafia presence in his neighborhood, led by Sonny. One day, Calogero witnesses Sonny shooting and killing a man assaulting his friend. When Calogero chooses to keep quiet when questioned by NYPD Detectives, Sonny takes a liking to him and gives him the nickname "C." Sonny's men offer Lorenzo a better paying job but, preferring a law-abiding life as a bus driver, he politely declines. Sonny befriends Calogero and introduces him to his crew. Calogero earns tips working in Sonny's bar and throwing dice, and is admonished by Lorenzo when he discovers the cash. Lorenzo returns the money to Sonny, and warns him to keep away from Calogero.

Eight years later, a 17-year old Calogero has been visiting Sonny regularly without his father's knowledge. Calogero is also part of a gang of local Italian-American boys, which concerns Sonny. Later, Calogero meets a black girl, Jane, and they develop a tentative friendship. Despite the high level of racial tension and dislike between Italian-Americans and African-Americans in the neighborhood, Calogero arranges a date with Jane. He asks for advice from both his father and Sonny, with the latter lending Calogero his car. Later, Calogero's friends beat up black cyclists who ride through their neighborhood, despite Calogero's attempts to defend them. One of the cyclists turns out to be Jane's brother, and he mistakes Calogero for one of the assailants and accuses him of beating him up when he and Jane meet for their date. Calogero loses his temper over the accusation, and calls him a nigger, which he instantly regrets. Jane leaves with her brother.

At home, Calogero is confronted by his father who had just seen him driving Sonny's car. An argument ensues and Calogero storms out. Shortly thereafter, Calogero is confronted by Sonny and his crew, who found a bomb on Sonny's car. Sonny confronts Calogero, and after the latter tearfully pleads his unwavering dedication to him, Sonny recognizes Calogero's innocence and allows him to leave. The black boys egg the Italian-American boys' usual spot in retaliation for the previous beating, and Calogero's friends make a plan to strike back using Molotov cocktails. They force Calogero to participate, but while on their way, Sonny stops their car and orders Calogero out. Calogero catches up with Jane, who tells him that her brother had later admitted that the boy who beat him up was not Calogero. Jane and Calogero make amends, but he suddenly remembers his friends' plans to attack Jane's neighborhood, and the two rush to stop them. During the attack, a black shopkeeper had thrown an unbroken Molotov cocktail back at the Italian-American boys' car which entered through the window igniting the other Molotov cocktails, resulting in an explosion that killed everyone inside. When Calogero and Jane arrive, they find the car engulfed in flames and the boys' dead bodies burned.

Calogero leaves and rushes into Sonny's bar to thank him for saving his life, but among the crowd, an assailant shoots Sonny in the back of the head before Calogero can warn him. Calogero later learns that the assailant was the son of the man he witnessed Sonny kill eight years earlier. At Sonny's funeral, countless people come to pay their respects. When the crowd disperses, a lone man, Carmine, visits the funeral, claiming that Sonny once saved his life as well. Calogero does not recognize Carmine until he sees a scar on his forehead and realizes he was the man being assaulted whom Sonny had defended when he committed the murder. Carmine tells Calogero that he is filling in for Sonny in the neighborhood for the time being, and promises Calogero help should he ever need. Carmine leaves just as Lorenzo unexpectedly arrives to pay his respects to Sonny. Lorenzo thanks him for saving his son's life and admits that he had never hated him, but that he had resented him for making Calogero grow up so quickly. Calogero and his father walk home together as Calogero narrates the lessons he learned from his two mentors.

Cast
 Robert De Niro as Lorenzo
 Chazz Palminteri as "Sonny"
 Lillo Brancato, Jr. as Calogero (age 17)
 Francis Capra as Calogero (age 9)
 Taral Hicks as Jane
 Kathrine Narducci as Rosina
 Clem Caserta as Jimmy "Whispers"
 Frank Pietrangolare as Danny "K.O."
 Joe Pesci as Carmine
 Alfred Sauchelli Jr. as Bobby "Bars"
 Robert D'Andrea as Tony "Toupee"
 Eddie Montanaro as Eddie "Mush"
 Fred Fischer as Joe "Jo Jo The Whale"
 Dave Salerno as Frankie "Coffeecake"
 Joe D'Onofrio as "Slick" (Age 17)
 Louis Vanaria as Mario "Crazy Mario"
 Domenick Lombardozzi as Nicky "Zero"

Production
The film is based on Chazz Palminteri's original play of the same name, which was performed as a one-man show, being largely based on his own childhood, specifically the shooting Calogero witnesses as a child, as well as the occupation and name of his father.

In 1990, at a performance of A Bronx Tale, Robert De Niro met with Palminteri in his dressing room after having seen the show. De Niro told Palminteri, "This is one of the greatest one-man shows I've ever seen, if not the greatest ... This is a movie, this is an incredible movie." After acquiring the rights to create the film, with De Niro claiming the deal was made solely with a gentlemen's agreement with Palminteri, the duo began crafting the screenplay. Prior to partnering with De Niro, Palminteri rejected several offers for the film's rights, including some as high as $1 million, due to not being granted the roles of primary screenwriter and Sonny, the gangster Calogero meets. De Niro met Palminteri's requirements on the condition that he be allowed to direct the film and play Lorenzo, Calogero's father, which Palminteri accepted.

Release

Theatrical
The film premiered at the Toronto International Film Festival on September 14, 1993. It was then released in the United States on September 29, 1993.

Home media 
Sometime after the film's theatrical run, HBO released the movie on VHS, CD and in 1998 on DVD. The DVD is out of print, but in January 2010, Focus Features released a DVD copy of the film exclusive to online retailer Amazon.

Reception

Box office
A Bronx Tale opened in 1,077 theaters, with an opening weekend gross of $3.7 million. It went on to make $17.3 million domestically.

Critical response
On Rotten Tomatoes the film holds an approval rating of 97% based on 33 reviews, with an average rating of 7.5/10. The site's critical consensus reads, "A Bronx Tale sets itself apart from other coming-of-age dramas thanks to a solid script, a terrific cast, and director Robert De Niro's sensitive work behind the camera." Metacritic gave it a weighted average score of 80 out of 100, based on 15 critics, indicating "generally favorable reviews".

Critic Roger Ebert gave the film four stars, calling it "very funny [and] very touching. It is filled with life and colorful characters and great lines of dialogue, and De Niro, in his debut as a director, finds the right notes as he moves from laughter to anger to tears [while] retaining its values."

In 2008, the American Film Institute nominated this film for its Top 10 Gangster Films list.

Awards and nominations

References

External links 

 
 
 
 
 

1993 crime drama films
1993 films
American crime drama films
American coming-of-age drama films
Films about the American Mafia
American gangster films
Films about race and ethnicity
American films based on plays
Films directed by Robert De Niro
Films set in the Bronx
Films set in 1960
Films set in 1968
Films about interracial romance
Films about racism
Savoy Pictures films
Belmont, Bronx
Films shot in New York City
Films shot in New Jersey
1993 directorial debut films
1990s coming-of-age drama films
Films about father–son relationships
Films produced by Jon Kilik
Films about Italian-American culture
1990s English-language films
1990s American films